Charles P. Casey (born January 11, 1942) is an organometallic chemist who was the 2004 President of the American Chemical Society.  He is currently the Homer Adkins Professor Emeritus of Chemistry at the University of Wisconsin-Madison.  He was elected to the National Academy of Sciences in 1993.

Education
Casey received his B.S. in Chemistry from St. Louis University in 1963, and his Ph.D. in Chemistry from MIT in 1967 under the direction of George M. Whitesides.  His thesis title was "Thermal decomposition of organocopper(I) compounds".  He was then a postdoctoral fellow in organic chemistry at Harvard University from 1967-1968.

Academic career
Casey's research program focuses on the mechanisms of homogeneously catalyzed reactions, and creating new reagents for organic synthesis including heterobimetallic catalysts.  More recently, his research has included studies of diruthenium hydrogenation catalysts, which contain both a protic and a hydridic hydrogen, and hydroformylation reaction catalyzed by chelating diphosphines with large P-M-P angles.

Casey has been a member of the faculty of the Department of Chemistry at the University of Wisconsin since 1968.  He achieved the rank of Full Professor in 1977.  Named positions he has held at Wisconsin include the Romnes Faculty Fellowship (1977), the Evan P. Helfaer Professorship (1985-1991), and the Homer B. Adkins Professorship (2004–present). Among the significant awards has received for his research are the American Chemical Society Award in Organometallic Chemistry in 1991, and the American Chemical Society Award for the Advancement of Inorganic Chemistry in 2011.

Casey's advisees include Steven H. Bertz, Joseph M. O'Connor, R. Morris Bullock, Seth R. Marder, Ross A. Widenhoefer, William D. Jones, Richard F. Jordan, Robert E. Colborn, L. Keith Woo, and Jon A. Tunge.

References

Living people
21st-century American chemists
University of Wisconsin–Madison faculty
Presidents of the American Chemical Society
Saint Louis University alumni
Massachusetts Institute of Technology School of Science alumni
Members of the United States National Academy of Sciences
1942 births
Harvard University alumni